Paico Classics, also Paico Classics Illustrated, was a series of Indian comic books published by Pai and Company (PAICO), Cochin between April 1984 and December 1988. The series were the reprints of "Pendulum Illustrated Classics" (Pendulum Press) translated into various Indian languages (initially in Malayalam, later in Tamil as well as the original English). R. Gopalakrishnan, also associated with the Poompatta children's magazine, was the editor of Paico Classics.

In 1985 February, prominent Malayalam authors Thakazhi Sivasankara Pillai, Kamala Surayya and M. T. Vasudevan Nair participated in the launching function of the series. 

Pai and Company republished the series in Malayalam and English during 1998–2000.

Titles published 
 20000 Leagues Under the Sea — Jules Verne
 A Christmas Carol — Charles Dickens
 A Midsummer Night's Dream — William Shakespeare
 A Tale of Two Cities — Charles Dickens
 As You Like It — William Shakespeare
 Ben-Hur — Lew Wallace
 Black Beauty — Anna Sewell
 Crime and Punishment — Fyodor Dostoyevsky
 Don Quixote — Miguel de Cervantes
 Dr. Jekyll and Mr. Hyde — Robert Louis Stevenson
 Dracula — Bram Stoker
 Food of the Gods — H. G. Wells
 Frankenstein — Mary Shelley
 Great Expectations — Charles Dickens
 Gulliver's Travels — Jonathan Swift
 Hamlet — William Shakespeare
 Huckleberry Finn — Samuel L. Clemens (Mark Twain)
 Iliad — Homer
 Ivanhoe — Walter Scott
 Julius Caesar — William Shakespeare
 Kidnapped — R L Stevenson
 King Lear — William Shakespeare
 Macbeth — William Shakespeare
 Merchant of Venice — William Shakespeare
 Moby Dick — Herman Melville
 Oliver Twist — Charles Dickens
 Othello — William Shakespeare
 Pride and Prejudice — Jane Austen
 Robinson Crusoe — Daniel Defoe
 Romeo and Juliet — William Shakespeare
 The Sea-Wolf — Jack London
 Stories of O. Henry — William Sidney Porter (O. Henry)
 Taming of the Shrew — William Shakespeare
 The Adventures of Sherlock Holmes — Arthur Conan Doyle
 The Hound of the Baskervilles — Arthur Conan Doyle
 The Hunchback of Notre Dame — Victor Hugo
 The Invisible Man — H. G. Wells
 The Man in the Iron Mask — Alexandre Dumas
 The Mysterious Island — Jules Verne
 The Odyssey — Homer
 The Prince and the Pauper — Samuel L. Clemens (Mark Twain)
 The Prisoner of Zenda — Anthony Hope
 The Return of the Native — Thomas Hardy
 The Scarlet Pimpernel — Baroness Orczy
 The Tempest — William Shakespeare
 The Three Musketeers — Alexandre Dumas
 The War of the Worlds — H. G. Wells
 The Time Machine — H. G. Wells
 Tom Sawyer — Samuel L. Clemens (Mark Twain)
 Treasure Island — Robert Louis Stevenson
 Twelfth Night — William Shakespeare

See also
 Anant Pai

External links

 Paico has started re-printing their original publications and is available for purchase at: http://ocomics.com

Indian comics